Lanham is a surname. Notable people with the surname include:

 Andrew Lanham, American film screenwriter
 Charles C. Lanham (1928-2015), American politician
 Charles T. Lanham (1902-1978), United States Army general
 Edwin Lanham (1904-1979), American writer
 Fritz G. Lanham (1880-1965), American politician
 Henderson Lovelace Lanham (1888-1957), American politician
 Leigh Lanham (born 1977), English speedway rider
 John Lanham (1924-2007), American judge
 Richard A. Lanham (born 1936), American rhetoric theorist
 Robert Lanham (born 1971), American satirist
 S. W. T. Lanham (1846-1908), American politician